Events from the 1210s in the Kingdom of Scotland.

Monarchs 

 William I, 1165–1214
 Alexander II, 1214–1249

Events 

 4 December 1214 – King William I dies in Stirling and is succeeded by his son, King Alexander II.
 6 December 1214 – Alexander II is crowned at Scone.
 1217 – Culross Abbey is established by Maol Choluim I, Earl of Fife in Culross.

Births 
Full date unknown
 c. 1210 – Gilbert, Earl of Orkney (died c. 1256)
 c. 1210 – Dervorguilla of Galloway (died 1290)
 c. 1210 – William de Moravia, 1st Earl of Sutherland (died 1248)
 1211 – Henry, Earl of Atholl
 c. 1213 – Patrick III, Earl of Dunbar (died 1289)
 1214 – Alexander Stewart, 4th High Steward of Scotland (died c. 1282)
 c. 1215 – John Comyn I of Badenoch (died c. 1274)
 c. 1215 – Robert de Brus, 5th Lord of Annandale (died 1295)

Deaths 

 16 July 1212 – William de Brus, 3rd Lord of Annandale
 4 December 1214 – King William I (born c. 1142)
 17 June 1219 – David, Earl of Huntingdon (born 1152)
Full date unknown
 c. 1211 – Gofraid mac Domnaill
 c. 1217 – Ailín II, Earl of Lennox
 c. 1219 – Hugh de Moravia

See also 

 List of years in Scotland
 Timeline of Scottish history

References 

1210s